Michael M. Horton (born July 17, 1954) is a Canadian football player who played professionally for the Calgary Stampeders and Toronto Argonauts.

References

1954 births
Living people
Toronto Argonauts players
Sportspeople from Portland, Oregon
Players of American football from Portland, Oregon
UCLA Bruins football players